Elections to Manchester City Council were held on 4 May 2006. One third of the council was up for election, with each successful candidate to serve a four-year term of office, expiring in 2010. The council stayed under Labour Party control, strengthened by four gains from the Liberal Democrats.

Election result
Changes in vote share are compared to the 2004 election.

Ward results
Below is a list of the 32 individual wards with the candidates standing in those wards and the number of votes the candidates acquired. Incumbent councillors seeking re-election were elected in 2004 and are marked with an asterisk.

Ancoats and Clayton

Ardwick

Baguley

Bradford

Brooklands

Burnage

Charlestown

Cheetham

Chorlton

Chorlton Park

City Centre

Crumpsall

Didsbury East

Didsbury West

Fallowfield

Gorton North

Gorton South

Harpurhey

Higher Blackley

Hulme

Levenshulme

Longsight

Miles Platting and Newton Heath

Moss Side

Moston

Northenden

Old Moat

Rusholme

Sharston

Whalley Range

Withington

Woodhouse Park

By-elections between 2006 and 2007

References

Manchester
2006
2000s in Manchester